Spigelia is a genus of flowering plants in the family Loganiaceae. It contains around 60 species, distributed over the warmer parts of the Americas, from the latitude of Buenos Aires to the Southern United States. It was named after Adriaan van den Spiegel (Adrianus Spigelius) by Carl Linnaeus in his 1753 Species Plantarum; the type species is Spigelia anthelmia. Pinkroot is a common name for plants in this genus.

Species
The following species are recognised by The Plant List:

Spigelia aceifolia Woodson
Spigelia alabamensis (K.R. Gould) K.G. Matthews & Weakley
Spigelia amambaiensis Fern. Casas
Spigelia amazonica Fern.Casas
Spigelia amplexicaulis E.F. Guim. & Fontella
Spigelia andersonii Fern. Casas
Spigelia andina Fern. Casas
Spigelia anthelmia L.
Spigelia araucariensis E.F. Guim. & Fontella
Spigelia asperifolia Progel
Spigelia bahiana L.B. Sm.
Spigelia beccabungoides Kraenzl.
Spigelia beyrichiana Cham. & Schltdl.
Spigelia blanchetiana DC.
Spigelia brachystachya Progel
Spigelia breviflora (Chodat & Hassl.) H.H. Hurley
Spigelia caaguazuensis Kraenzl.
Spigelia carnosa Standl. & Steyerm.
Spigelia cascatensis E.F. Guim. & Fontella
Spigelia catarinensis E.F. Guim. & Fontella
Spigelia chiapensis K.R. Gould
Spigelia coelostylioides K.R. Gould
Spigelia dolichostachya Fern. Casas
Spigelia dusenii L.B. Sm.
Spigelia elsieana Fern. Casas
Spigelia flava Zappi & Harley
Spigelia flemmingiana Cham. & Schltdl.
Spigelia fontellae Fern. Casas
Spigelia gentianoides Chapm.
Spigelia genuflexa Popovkin & Struwe
Spigelia gilgii J.F. Macbr.
Spigelia glabrata Mart.
Spigelia gracilis A. DC.
Spigelia guianensis (Aubl.) Lemée
Spigelia hamelioides Kunth
Spigelia hatschbachii Fern. Casas
Spigelia hedyotidea A. DC.
Spigelia heliotropoides E.F. Guim. & Fontella
Spigelia herzogiana Kraenzl.
Spigelia hirtula Fern. Casas
Spigelia hurleyi Fern. Casas
Spigelia insignis Progel
Spigelia kleinii L.B.Sm.
Spigelia kuhlmannii E.F. Guim. & Fontella-Pereira
Spigelia laevigata Progel
Spigelia laurina Cham. & Schltdl.
Spigelia leiocarpa Benth. ex H.H. Hurley
Spigelia linarioides DC.
Spigelia loganioides (Torr. & A. Gray) A. DC.
Spigelia luciatlantica Fern. Casas
Spigelia lundiana A. DC.
Spigelia macrophylla (Pohl) DC.
Spigelia marilandica L.
Spigelia martiana Cham. & Schltdl.
Spigelia nana Alain
Spigelia nicotianiflora Chodat & Hassl.
Spigelia novogranatensis Fern. Casas
Spigelia olfersiana Cham. & Schltdl.
Spigelia palmeri Rose
Spigelia paraguariensis Chodat
Spigelia paraguayensis Chodat
Spigelia pedunculata Kunth
Spigelia persicarioides Ewan
Spigelia petiolata H.H. Hurley
Spigelia polystachya Klotzsch ex Prog.
Spigelia pulchella Mart.
Spigelia pusilla Mart.
Spigelia pygmaea D.N. Gibson
Spigelia ramosa L.B. Sm.
Spigelia reitzii L.B. Sm.
Spigelia riedeliana (Progel) E.F. Guim. & Fontella
Spigelia riparia L.B. Sm.
Spigelia rojasiana Kraenzl.
Spigelia rondoniensis Fern. Casas
Spigelia scabra Cham. & Schltdl.
Spigelia scabrella Benth.
Spigelia schlechtendaliana Mart.
Spigelia sellowiana Cham. & Schltdl.
Spigelia sordida Fern. Casas
Spigelia spartioides Cham. & Schltdl.
Spigelia speciosa Kunth
Spigelia splendens H. Wendl. ex Hook.
Spigelia stenocardia (Standl.) Fern. Casas
Spigelia stenophylla Progel
Spigelia tetraptera Taub.
Spigelia texana (Torr. & A. Gray) A. DC.
Spigelia trispicata H.H. Hurley ex K.R. Gould
Spigelia valenzuelae Chodat & Hassl.
Spigelia vestita L.B. Sm.

References

External links

Loganiaceae
Gentianales genera